Greatest Hits is the first official compilation album by KC and the Sunshine Band. The album was released in February 1980 on the TK label.

History
The album contained two newly recorded tracks, "All I Want" and "Let's Go Rock and Roll". The latter was released as a moderately successful single to promote the compilation.

Track listing

Personnel
Harry Wayne Casey – keyboards, vocal
Jerome Smith – guitar
Richard Finch – bass guitar, drum, percussion
Robert Johnson – drums
Fermin Goytisolo – percussion

Certifications

References

External links
 Greatest Hits at Discogs

KC and the Sunshine Band albums
1980 greatest hits albums